Sir Maurice Benjamin Batho, 2nd Baronet (14 January 1910 - 12 January 1990) was an English baronet.

Batho was the son of Sir Charles Albert Batho, 1st Baronet, and Bessie née Parker. He was educated at Uppingham School. In 1934 he married Antoinette d’Udekem d’Acoz: they had four children, two sons and two daughters. During World War II he served with the King's Royal Rifle Corps

Notes 

1910 births
1990 deaths
People educated at Uppingham School
Baronets in the Baronetage of the United Kingdom
King's Royal Rifle Corps officers